Truskmore is a mountain with a height of  on the border of County Sligo and County Leitrim in Ireland. It is the highest summit in the Dartry Mountains and the highest in Sligo. It is in the middle of a plateau whose edges are marked by high cliffs, including Benbulbin (526m), Benwiskin (514m), Slievemore (597m) and Kings Mountain (462m). The top of Truskmore lies in County Sligo, a short distance from the border with County Leitrim; however, the mountain itself is in both counties.

Transmission site
The Truskmore television transmitter opened on 1 February 1962, the second of the original five main Telefis Éireann transmitters to go on air after Kippure (December 1961). Initially its transmissions were only in 405 lines on VHF channel 11, with 625-lines transmissions beginning in November 1963 on Channel I. The new RTÉ Radio VHF FM radio service was added in 1966. The second television service came in 1978 on Channel G and UHF television transmission began in 1996 with the advent of Teilifís na Gaeilge. In 2009 a new 175-m mast was erected in preparation for the changeover to digital television transmission and the original 1961 mast was removed. 
Since the national shutdown of the analog television networks on 24 October 2012, Truskmore now broadcasts the Irish DTT service Saorview and the national FM radio channels to the northwest of Ireland, including a large area of the west of Northern Ireland. The site is owned and operated by 2RN, a subsidiary of the Irish public service broadcaster RTÉ.

Current transmissions

Digital television

Analog FM radio

DTT relay transmitters

Gallery

See also

Truskmore SE Cairn
List of Irish counties by highest point
List of tallest structures in Ireland
Lists of mountains in Ireland
Lists of mountains and hills in the British Isles
List of Marilyns in the British Isles
List of Hewitt mountains in England, Wales and Ireland

References

Hewitts of Ireland
Marilyns of Ireland
Mountains and hills of County Sligo
Mountains and hills of County Leitrim
Highest points of Irish counties
Transmitter sites in Ireland
Mountains under 1000 metres